Millie Davis (born 6 December 2006) is a Canadian actress who plays Ms. O / Big O in the TVOKids/PBS Kids series Odd Squad, Riley in the television show Dino Dana, Summer in Wonder, and Gemma Hendrix in Orphan Black. She was nominated for a Canadian Screen Award for Best Performance by an Actress in a Leading Role in a Dramatic Program or Limited Series as Ms. O in Odd Squad: The Movie at the 5th Canadian Screen Awards and has been co-nominated with the Odd Squad cast for four additional awards, including winning the award for "Best Young Ensemble in a TV Series" at the 2015 Joey Awards.

Early life
Born to Megan and Wayne Davis, Millie and her older brother, Drew, are actors who have both appeared in Orphan Black, among other roles. Her parents run the Charactors Theatre Troupe in Thornhill, Ontario.

Career
In June 2007, when she was six months old, Davis began her career in acting when she first appeared in a commercial with her father and she began TV roles beginning in the late 2000s, shortly before she turned four.

Davis was 7 years old during the first season of Odd Squad, and 13 years old at the start of the third season, where she was the only original cast member still on the show. Her character, Big O, was given a new assignment, and appears to have left the show, in the season three episode "Odd Off The Press", partly since Davis now stars in The Parker Andersons/Amelia Parker.

Interviewed in February 2023 when she was 16, she said that it has been a "trial and error process" keeping up with both school and acting work, although she thinks it has been a net benefit. Her advice to aspiring child actors is that it is "it's less of a hobby than it is a job".

Filmography

Film

Television

References

External links
 
 Charactors Theatre Troupe

21st-century Canadian actresses
Actresses from Toronto
Black Canadian actresses
Canadian child actresses
Canadian film actresses
Canadian television actresses
Living people
2006 births
Canadian people of Jamaican descent